The Museo dell'Opera del Duomo is an art museum in Siena, in Tuscany in central Italy. It houses works of art and architectural fragments that were formerly in, or a part of, the Duomo of Siena (Siena Cathedral). These include a number of Italian Gothic sculptures by Giovanni Pisano and his school from the façade of the cathedral; the Maestà of Duccio di Boninsegna, which was the altarpiece from about 1311 until 1505 or 1506; and works by Ambrogio and Pietro Lorenzetti.

References

Art museums and galleries in Siena
Art museums established in 1879
Religious museums in Italy
1879 establishments in Italy